Aileen S. Kraditor (April 12, 1928 – March 8, 2020) was an American historian who has written a number of works on the history of feminism.

Career

Aileen Kraditor obtained a B.A. at Brooklyn College and then an M.A. and Ph.D. at Columbia University. She taught at Rhode Island College before obtaining a position at Boston University in 1973, as a teacher of the history of modern US reform movements. She was granted fellowships by the Guggenheim Foundation and the National Endowment for the Humanities. As of 2014 she was Professor Emerita of History at Boston University.

Views

Kraditor was influenced by Betty Friedan, author of The Feminine Mystique.
Writing in the mid-1960s, she made the case that to understand the history of women in America it was necessary to look at ideology as well as events.
Her The Ideas of the Woman Suffrage Movement (1965) was a pioneering work on the subject of great value to later historians. She noted that there was a gradual shift in the arguments of suffragists from "justice" to "expediency."
The 19th-century activists argued that women should be treated equally to men because of justice and natural rights.
Later activists stressed that "woman suffrage would benefit society."

In her important introduction to the anthology up From the Pedestal (1968), she said that "the question of 'spheres, which seemed to somehow be linked to the industrial revolution, was key to understanding feminism in America. 
She contrasted "women's proper sphere" to "autonomy" and pointed out how much emphasis the opponents of women's suffrage placed on preserving separate spheres.
Kraditor admired the social perfectionists led by William Lloyd Garrison.
In 1973, she said that the Liberty Party was "conceived in frustration, acted out a farce, and died in betrayal."
Kraditor's early history of female abolitionists may have been the most influential work on women's anti-slavery organizations.
The history went into detail on the objections by men to the public roles that abolitionist women played, objections that may have helped inspire the women.

Kraditor was a member of the Communist Party for eleven years. She noted there were two types of members, those driven by hostility and those who were generous and kind, both types being sincere idealists who deeply believed in justice, equality and ending poverty and discrimination.
Commenting on the communist historian Herbert Aptheker, Kraditor pointed out, "Aptheker kept repeating that certain turn-of-the [19th] century racist historians of Reconstruction typified academic scholarship in that field, long after this had stopped being true."

Works

Kraditor's published works include:

References

Sources

1928 births
2020 deaths
20th-century American historians
Brooklyn College alumni
Columbia University alumni
Boston University faculty